Suncus is a genus of shrews in the family Soricidae.

Classification
Genus Suncus
 Taita shrew, Suncus aequatorius
 Black shrew, Suncus ater
 Day's shrew, Suncus dayi
 Etruscan shrew, Suncus etruscus
 Sri Lankan shrew, Suncus fellowesgordoni
 Bornean pygmy shrew, Suncus hosei
 Hutu-Tutsi dwarf shrew, Suncus hututsi
 Least dwarf shrew, Suncus infinitesimus
 Greater dwarf shrew, Suncus lixa
 Madagascan pygmy shrew, Suncus madagascariensis
 Malayan pygmy shrew, Suncus malayanus
 Climbing shrew, Suncus megalurus
 Flores shrew, Suncus mertensi
 Asian highland shrew, Suncus montanus
 Asian house shrew, Suncus murinus
 Remy's pygmy shrew, Suncus remyi
 Anderson's shrew, Suncus stoliczkanus
 Lesser dwarf shrew, Suncus varilla
 Jungle shrew, Suncus zeylanicus

References

 
Mammal genera
Taxa named by Christian Gottfried Ehrenberg